The Coso Volcanic Field is located in Inyo County, California, at the western edge of the Basin and Range geologic province and northern region of the Mojave Desert. The Fossil Falls are part of the Coso Field, created by the prehistoric Owens River. They are within the Naval Air Weapons Station China Lake and northeast of Little Lake and U.S. Route 395.

Geology
Initiation of volcanism at Coso preceded the onset of Basin and Range crustal extension there, as expressed by normal faulting. The earlier of the two principal periods of volcanism began with the emplacement of basalt flows over a surface of little relief. Then, during the ensuing period of approximately 1.5 million years, eruptive activity included chemically more evolved rocks erupted upon a faulted terrain of substantial relief. Following a 1.5-million-year hiatus with few eruptions, a bimodal volcanic field of basalt lava flows and rhyolite lava domes and flows developed on Basin and Range terrain of essentially the same form as today's landscape. Many of the young basalt flows are intercanyon, occupying parts of the present-day drainage system.

The Coso Volcanic Field is best known for its Pleistocene rhyolite. Thirty-eight rhyolite domes and flows form an elongate array atop a north-trending 8 x 20-kilometer horst of Mesozoic bedrock. Nearby uneroded constructional forms are exhibited by most domes. Many are nested within tuff ring craters, and a few filled and overrode their craters to feed flows a kilometer or two long. The two oldest domes contain several percent phenocrysts; the rest are essentially aphyric. Obsidian is exposed locally on most extrusions, and analyses of fresh glass indicate that all of the rhyolite is of the so-called high-silica variety; SiO2 content is essentially constant at 77 percent. Other major-element constituents are nearly invariant. However, trace-element contents vary and help define 7 age groups, each of unique chemical composition.

Prehistoric Period
Obsidian from the Coso Volcanic Fields was heavily exploited by Native American Coso People to make knives, projectile points, and the like (Hughes 1998).  The chief period of exploitation was between approximately 3000 and 1000 years ago, when people mined obsidian by constructing benches in hillsides and digging deep pits to access raw materials (Elston and Zeier 1984; Gilreath and Hildebrand 1997).  Obsidian from the volcanic fields was traded all the way to the California coast in San Diego, San Luis Obispo County, Santa Barbara, California, and throughout the Mojave Desert and regions further east.  Archaeologists recognize at least four different geochemical subsources: Sugarloaf, West Sugarloaf, Joshua Ridge, and West Cactus Peak.  These different subsources were used to varying degrees in different time periods, but the Sugarloaf and West Sugarloaf were the most commonly exploited geochemical types (Eerkens and Rosenthal 2004; Ericson and Glascock 2004).

Coso Geothermal Power Project

The Coso Volcanic Field is well known as a geothermal area. Fumaroles are present along faults bounding the rhyolite-capped horst and locally within the rhyolite field. A multi-disciplinary program of geothermal assessment carried out in the 1970s defined a potential resource of 650 megawatts electric with a nominal life span of 30 years. Judged by the youthfulness of the rhyolite lavas and by a zone of low seismic velocity crust roughly beneath the rhyolite, a magma body may be the source of thermal energy for the geothermal system.

Commercial power development began in the 1980s. Located within the Naval Air Weapons Station China Lake Station near Ridgecrest, California, power plants at the Coso Geothermal were operated by Caithness Energy, LLC (Reno, Nevada) and sold in 2006. It currently produces 270 MW from four geothermal power plants. More than 100 wells have been drilled throughout the field, with production depths from 2,000 to 12,000 feet (610 to 3,700 m), and temperatures from 200° to 350 °C. Coso began generating electricity in 1987. Improvements have resulted in more efficient use of the resource.

Seismicity 
The Coso Volcanic Field is one of the most seismically active regions in the United States, producing dozens of tremors in the M1 and M2 range each week.  Tremors in the M3 range occur at a rate of 2–6 per month and M4 quakes occur two-three times each year.  Recent activity in the M5 range happened in 1996 and 1998 when tremors of M5.3, M5.1, M5.2, and M5.0 occurred within a day of each other.  These tremors were actually recorded along the eastern side of the Coso Volcanic Field, 15 miles (24 km). September 30, 2009 to October 6, 2009 there have been 429 earthquakes ranging from 0.1 to 5.2.  Some days have activity at about one tremor every minute.  On October 2, 2009 there were three earthquakes, (5.2, 4.7, and a 4.9), all within one hour of each other.

On July 4th and 5th, 2019 two large earthquakes sparked a surge of activity in the area in and around the Coso Volcanic Field. The first large quake on July 4 registered M6.4 and the largest on July 5 registered M7.1. Within a week, more than 8000 (M1.0-4.5) smaller earthquakes had joined the swarm, though only 27 quakes larger than M4.5 occurred after the largest events. Surprisingly, there were no fatalities in California. 
Residents in Ridgecrest and neighboring unincorporated town Trona had moderate to severe property damage. Two structure fires, loss of power for up to 24 hours in some areas, and Trona was without water. Highway 178, one of the two ways  in or out of Trona was blocked from rockslides and impassable shifted sections 
of asphalt. Ridgecrest had declared a state of emergency as a result. One fatality was reported in Nevada in the following days.

Earthquake swarms are common in the Coso area, often producing hundreds of tremors over periods as short as a few days.  This brisk and robust seismic activity is common in volcanic areas, such as Long Valley Caldera near Mammoth Lakes, and Yellowstone Caldera at Yellowstone.  The Coso Volcanic Field shows examples of volcanic activity, probably last active 30,000 to 40,000 years ago, but ash emission and small cone building episodes may be Holocene (>10,000 years) in age.

See also
Coso Hot Springs
Coso Range
Coso Rock Art District
Fossil Falls
Lists of volcanoes

References

Further reading 

Eerkens, Jelmer W. and Jeffrey S. Rosenthal. 2004. Are Obsidian Subsources Meaningful Units of Analysis?: Temporal and Spatial Patterning of Subsources in the Coso Volcanic Field, Southeastern California. Journal of Archaeological Science 31:21–29.
Elston, Robert G. and Charles D. Zeier. 1984. The Sugarloaf Obsidian Quarry. Report prepared for the Naval Weapons Center, China Lake, California, by Intermountain Research. NWC Administrative Publication 313.
Ericson, Jonathon E. and Michael D. Glascock. 2004. Subsource Characterization: Obsidian Utilization of Subsources of the Coso Volcanic Field, Coso Junction, California, USA. Geoarchaeology 19:779–805.
Garfinkel, Alan P.  2006.  Paradigm Shifts, Rock Art Studies, and the "Coso Sheep Cult" of Eastern California.  North American Archaeologist 27(3):203–244
Garfinkel, Alan P.  2007.  Archaeology and Rock Art of the Eastern Sierra and Great Basin Frontier.  Maturango Museum Publication Number 22.  Maturango Press, Ridgecrest, California.
Garfinkel, Alan P., Donald R. Austin, David Earle, and Harold Williams. 2009. Myth, Ritual and Rock Art:  Coso Decorated Animal-Humans and the Animal Master. Rock Art Research 26(2):179–197.  The Journal of the Australian Rock Art Research Association (AURA) and of the International Federation of Rock Art Organizations (IFRAO).
 Garfinkel, Alan P., David A. Young, and Robert M. Yohe, II.  2010. Bighorn Hunting, Resource Depression, and Rock Art in the Coso Range of Eastern California:  A Computer Simulation Model. Journal of Archaeological Science 37:42–51.
 Gilreath, Amy J. and William R. Hildebrandt. 1997. Prehistoric Use of the Coso Volcanic Field. Contributions of the University of California Archaeological Research Facility No. 56, Berkeley, California.
Hughes, Richard E. 1988. The Coso Volcanic Field Reexamined: Implications for Obsidian Sourcing and Hydration Dating Research. Geoarchaeology 3:253–265.

External links
Recent Earthquakes for the Coso Range
USGS Coso Volcanic Field, California

Protected areas of the Mojave Desert
Landforms of Inyo County, California
Volcanic fields of the Great Basin section
Pleistocene lava domes
Monogenetic volcanic fields
Volcanic fields of California
Geothermal power stations in California